Terminator X & The Valley of the Jeep Beets is the debut solo album by American DJ Terminator X, released in 1991. Produced by Terminator X and Carl Ryder, the album was moderately successful, reaching number 97 on the Billboard 200 and number 19 on the Top R&B/Hip-Hop Albums chart. Two successful singles were released: "Homey Don't Play Dat," which made it to number one on the  Hot Rap Singles, and "Buck Whylin'," which made it to number 7 on the Hot Rap Singles and featured Chuck D and Sister Souljah, as well as a sample from "Rise Above" by Black Flag.

Critical reception
The Encyclopedia of Popular Music wrote that the album confirmed Terminator X "as one of the finest DJs in the business." Trouser Press wrote that the album mostly "features little-known artists ... with average skills; the Terminator’s beats are likewise less than monumental." Spin called the album "the vinyl version of a great block party backed by the world's best DJ."

Track listing
"Vendetta...the Big Getback"—0:34
"Buck Whylin' (featuring Chuck D & Sister Souljah)—4:15
"Homey Don't Play Dat"—4:12
"Juvenile Delinquintz"—4:12
"The Blues"—6:04 (by Andreaus 13 and Dj Mars)
"Back to the Scene of the Bass"—4:19
"Can't Take My Style"—1:14
"Wanna be Dancin'"—3:56
"DJ is the Selector"—2:53
"Run That Go-Power Thang"—2:53
"No Further"—3:42
"High Priest of Turbulence"—1:46
"Ain't Got Nuttin'"—3:49

Charts

Singles
Homey Don't Play Dat

Wanna Be Dancin (Buck-Whylin)

References

Terminator X albums
1991 debut albums